Ben Joseph Brush, Jr. (December 5, 1955 – May 7, 2015) was an American businessman and politician.

Born in Tucker, Georgia, Brush graduated from Southern Polytechnic State University and was a real estate broker and home builder. Brush served in the Georgia House of Representatives, as a Republican, from 1992 to 1993 and from 1995 to 1996. From 1997 until 2004 he served in the Georgia State Senate including time as the Chairman of Senate Education Committee.  On May 7, 2015, Brush was killed in an automobile accident in Columbia County, Georgia, when his motorcycle collided with a car whose driver pulled out in front of him.

Notes

1955 births
2015 deaths
People from Tucker, Georgia
Businesspeople from Georgia (U.S. state)
Republican Party members of the Georgia House of Representatives
Republican Party Georgia (U.S. state) state senators
Road incident deaths in Georgia (U.S. state)
Motorcycle road incident deaths
Southern Polytechnic State University
21st-century American politicians
20th-century American businesspeople